The Japanese burrowing cricket (Velarifictorus micado) is a cricket in the subfamily Gryllinae (family Gryllidae) and tribe Modicogryllini.  It is found throughout South Asia, along with an introduced population in the United States. It was first reported in the US in 1959, likely as overwintering eggs in the soil of imported plants, and has since spread all throughout the eastern half of the country.

References

Further reading
 Alexander, Richard D., and Thomas J. Walker (1962). Two introduced field crickets new to eastern United States (Orthoptera: Gryllidae). Annals of the Entomological Society of America, vol. 55, no. 1, 90-94.
 
 Field Guide To Grasshoppers, Katydids, And Crickets Of The United States, Capinera, Scott, Walker. 2004. Cornell University Press.

External links
NCBI Taxonomy Browser, Velarifictorus micado

Gryllinae